A Historic Site or Monument (HSM) is a protected location of historic interest on the continent of Antarctica, or on its adjacent islands. The list of historic sites was first drawn up in 1972, and has since expanded to cover 95 sites, with the most recent listed in 2021. Five sites have been removed from the list for various reasons.

Historic Sites and Monuments are protected under the Antarctic Treaty System, as one of three classes of Antarctic Protected Areas.

The criteria for listing a site are that it should fulfil one or more of the following criteria:

List of HSMs

|}

See also
Antarctic Specially Protected Area
UNESCO World Heritage Site

References

External links

ATCM Measure 12 (2019). Annex: Revised List of Historic Sites and Monuments. - ATCM Prague, 9 October 2019. 24 pp

 
Antartica
History of Antarctica
Protected areas of Antarctica